The Paul Pellas-Graham Ryder Award is jointly sponsored by the Meteoritical Society and the Planetary Geology Division of the Geological Society of America. It recognizes the best planetary science paper, published during the previous year in a peer-reviewed scientific journal, and written by an undergraduate or graduate student (as first author). The topics covered by the award are listed on the cover of Meteoritics and Planetary Science.  It has been given since 2002, and honors the memories of the incomparable meteoriticist Paul Pellas and lunar scientist Graham Ryder.

There have been 21 recipients of the award since its inception in 2002. The recipient's journal articles awarded have collectively been cited more than 2100 times as of December 31, 2019.

Paul Pellas-Graham Ryder Award Winners
Sources: Meteoritical Society, GSA Planetary Geology Division

*Timing of award adjusted by presenting two in the same year.

**Jointly awarded to two recipients in the same year.

See also

 List of astronomy awards
 Glossary of meteoritics
 Venus
 Comet
 Solar nebula
 Chondrule
 Mars
 Asteroid
 Moon
 Cretaceous-Paleogene boundary
 Breccia
 Enceladus
 Isotope
 Io (moon)
 Murchison meteorite
 Pluto
 Tungsten

References

Astronomy prizes
Meteorite prizes
American awards
Awards established in 2000